Charmauvillers is a commune in the department of Doubs, in the eastern French region of Bourgogne-Franche-Comté.

Population

See also
 Communes of the Doubs department

References

Communes of Doubs